FU Tauri is a brown dwarf binary system in the constellation of Taurus about  away.  The secondary is very close to the lower limit for brown dwarfs and several databases list it as a distant massive exoplanet.

System 

Properties 
Both members of the binary are low-mass objects still contracting towards the main sequence. Comparison with theoretical evolutionary tracks gives them ages of one Myr or less. However, the primary is more luminous than expected even for this age and it may be younger than the secondary.

Variability 
FU Tauri varies in brightness. The primary star is a T Tauri variable, a type of irregular pre-main-sequence star. Its brightness has been observed to vary from a photovisual magnitude of 16.0 to fainter than 17.0. Its photographic magnitude has been measured to vary between magnitude 15.1 and below magnitude 17.6.

References 

Brown dwarfs
T Tauri stars
Taurus (constellation)
J04233539+2503026
Tauri, FU